Manuel Sanchís Martínez (26 March 1938 – 28 October 2017) was a Spanish footballer who played as a defender.

Like his son, Manolo Sanchís, he represented Real Madrid and Spain. They were one of only four father/son pairs to have won the European Cup/Champions League (the others being Cesare and Paolo Maldini, Carles and Sergio Busquets and Zinedine and Luca Zidane), and he played 213 La Liga matches over ten seasons.

An international during nearly two years, Sanchís appeared with the national team at the 1966 World Cup.

Playing career
Sanchís was born in Alberic, Valencia. During his career he represented CD Condal, Real Valladolid, Real Madrid and Córdoba CF, and he was a member of the successful Madrid sides in the mid-60s that won four La Liga championships in five years, with the addition of the 1965–66 edition of the European Cup (in this competition, he appeared 35 times for the club).

Sanchís earned 11 caps for Spain, and represented the nation at the 1966 FIFA World Cup. During the group stages, he scored a rare goal in a 2–1 win against Switzerland.

International goals
Scores and results list. Spain's goal tally first.

Playing style
An offensive-minded defender, who initially played as a forward earlier in his career, Sanchís was known for his exceptional physical qualities, including his strength, as well as his class and skills as a defender.

Coaching career
After retiring, Sanchís started working as a coach. After beginning with Real Madrid's youths, he also managed CD Tenerife in the second division before taking the reins of the Equatorial Guinea national team.

As the nation was immersed in a situation that would lead to the coup d'état against Francisco Macías Nguema, the sporting facilities in the country suffered from a deep lack of investment, and Sanchís eventually left his post and returned to his country. He subsequently was in charge of lowly AD Torrejón, AD Parla, Daimiel CF, CD Don Benito and UD Alzira, mainly in the Community of Madrid.

Death
Sanchís died on 28 October 2017 in Madrid at the age of 79, from pulmonary embolism.

Honours
Real Madrid
La Liga: 1964–65, 1966–67,  1967–68, 1968–69
Copa del Generalísimo: 1969–70
European Cup: 1965–66

References

External links

 

1938 births
2017 deaths
Spanish footballers
Footballers from the Valencian Community
Association football defenders
La Liga players
Segunda División players
CD Condal players
Real Valladolid players
Real Madrid CF players
Córdoba CF players
UEFA Champions League winning players
Spain international footballers
1966 FIFA World Cup players
Spanish football managers
Segunda División managers
Segunda División B managers
CD Tenerife managers
Equatorial Guinea national football team managers
Spanish expatriate football managers
Expatriate football managers in Equatorial Guinea
Spanish expatriate sportspeople in Equatorial Guinea